Cedar Grove, Tennessee may refer to the following places in Tennessee:
Cedar Grove, Bedford County, Tennessee, an unincorporated community
Cedar Grove, Carroll County, Tennessee, an unincorporated community
Cedar Grove, Henderson County, Tennessee, an unincorporated community
Cedar Grove, Humphreys County, Tennessee, an unincorporated community
Cedar Grove, Pickett County, Tennessee, an unincorporated community
Cedar Grove, Roane County, Tennessee, an unincorporated community
Cedar Grove, Rutherford County, Tennessee, an unincorporated community
Cedar Grove (east), Sullivan County, Tennessee, an unincorporated community
Cedar Grove (west), Sullivan County, Tennessee, an unincorporated community
Cedar Grove, Van Buren County, Tennessee, an unincorporated community
Cedar Grove, Wilson County, Tennessee, an unincorporated community